Alonso Reno Edward Henry (born 8 December 1989), commonly known as  Alonso Edward, is a Panamanian sprinter who specialises in the 100 and 200 metres.

He set a South American junior record in the 100 m in 2007 and he attended his first World Junior Championships in 2008, finishing in sixth place. He made significant improvements in the 2009 season, setting national records in the 100 m and 200 m in May, and winning both events at the 2009 South American Championships in Athletics. Prior to the 2009 World Championships he again beat the 200 m national record, becoming the fourth fastest runner of the season. At his first ever World Championships he set a South American record to win the silver medal in the 200 metres final, becoming the youngest ever medallist in that event.

Early career
Born in Panama City, Panamá, he is of Jamaican descent on his mother's side.  He was initially coached by Cecilio Woodruf in his home country and came to prominence on the youth and junior athletics circuit, winning a 100/200 m double at the South American Youth Championships and the 100 m gold at the 2007 South American Junior Championships. His time of 10.28 seconds, at the junior championships, was a new South American junior record, improving upon his own previous mark. He also attended the 2007 Pan American Junior Championships, but pulled up in the heats. Following in the footsteps of fellow Panamanian athlete Irving Saladino, he moved to train in Brazil but an injury interrupted the start of his season, all but eliminating his chances to qualify for the 2008 Summer Olympics. While recovering, Edward moved to the United States and enrolled with Barton County Community College in Great Bend, Kansas, working under the tutelage of Matt Kane. He made his first appearance at a world competition; the 2008 World Junior Championships in Athletics. A season's best run of 10.91 seconds in the 100 m saw him eliminated in the heats stage.

Breakthrough season
In the 2009 athletics season, Edward had markedly improved from the previous season: at the Texas Invitational meet in early May, he ran 9.97 seconds to break the 10-second barrier, with the wind assistance just over the legal limit (2.3 m/s). Later that month he broke two national records, running 10.09 seconds in the 100 m and 20.34 seconds in the 200 m at a meet in Hutchinson, Kansas. The following month he proved his ability to win at the senior regional level, taking two gold medals in a sprint double at the 2009 South American Championships in Athletics. He beat the competition in the 200 m by almost half a second, finishing with 20.45 seconds.

Further improvements came in the 200 m in Rethymno in July, as he broke his own national record to win in twenty seconds flat. This time ranked him as fourth fastest in the world coming into the 2009 World Championships in Athletics, with only Usain Bolt, Tyson Gay, and Wallace Spearmon running faster.

In the 200 metres at the World Championships, Edward reached a new level of performance. Touted as a possible surprise finalist, he started well, winning his heat and his quarter-final. In the semi-finals, he finished second to Usain Bolt and was the third fastest of the round overall, after Spearmon, with a run of 20.22 seconds. Although Bolt won the final race by a margin of 0.62 seconds to set a new world record, Edward set a South American record of 19.81 seconds. He had started the season with a best of 20.62 seconds, but he had improved by 0.81 seconds in just one year, breaking Bolt's previous record for the fastest time by a 19-year-old and becoming the youngest ever World Championship medallist in the men's 200 m in the process.

Prior to the 2010 season, Edward decided that he would miss the 2010 World Indoor Championships in Athletics in favour of focusing upon the first IAAF Diamond League, keen to become the first South American to break the 10-second barrier. He began his outdoor season in April, winning the 100 m gold at the Central American Games in Panama, but he suffered a strained hamstring in the 200 m and missed much of the year through the injury.

Personal bests

All information taken from IAAF profile.

Competition record

1Did not finish in the semifinal

Notes
His name is frequently written as Alonso Edwards, with his surname being anglicised. However, the name which the athlete himself uses is Alonso Edward without the final "s".

References

External links

Alonso Edward profile 

Tilastopaja biography
Interview after running sub-10 seconds in Texas

1989 births
Living people
Panamanian male sprinters
Panamanian people of Jamaican descent
Athletes (track and field) at the 2012 Summer Olympics
Athletes (track and field) at the 2016 Summer Olympics
Olympic athletes of Panama
World Athletics Championships medalists
Barton Cougars men's track and field athletes
Junior college men's track and field athletes in the United States
Sportspeople from Panama City
World Athletics Championships athletes for Panama
Athletes (track and field) at the 2015 Pan American Games
Pan American Games medalists in athletics (track and field)
Pan American Games bronze medalists for Panama
Athletes (track and field) at the 2018 South American Games
Competitors at the 2018 Central American and Caribbean Games
Central American and Caribbean Games silver medalists for Panama
South American Games gold medalists for Panama
South American Games medalists in athletics
Central American Games gold medalists for Panama
Central American Games medalists in athletics
Athletes (track and field) at the 2019 Pan American Games
Diamond League winners
IAAF Continental Cup winners
Central American and Caribbean Games medalists in athletics
Medalists at the 2015 Pan American Games
South American Games gold medalists in athletics
Athletes (track and field) at the 2020 Summer Olympics
21st-century Panamanian people